Poliopastea hesione is a moth of the family Erebidae. It was described by Herbert Druce in 1888. It is found in Panama.

References

Poliopastea
Moths described in 1888